Valerianella radiata, synonyms Valerianella stenocarpa and Valerianella woodsiana, common name beaked cornsalad, is a plant native to the United States. It is an annual self pollinating flowering plant and besides being mildly edible there are no known uses. Valerianella radiata flowers from April- May.

Description 
Valerianella radiata typically grows to a high of 0.6 m (2 ft). Flowers are perfect. Has 5 white flower petals that are arranged bilaterally symmetrical with fused sepals. Simple, entire, and toothed leaves with opposite arrangement of two leaves per node on stem. It has a stamen count of three that produces dry fruit 2 - 2.5 mm long. It has a pistil count of one with three carpels, inferiors ovary with 3 locales and one ovule, slightly 3-lobed stigmas. Valerianella radiata  has a corolla length of less than 2 mm. The fruit is usually yellowish and glabrous to finely pubescent and the fertile cells are slightly narrower than sterile cells. A groove forms between the narrow and fertile sides of the fruit. It is a self-fertile plant due to having both male and female organs. Stems are hollow and ascend to erect, dichotomously branching (an important diagnostic character), angled, and glabrous to sparse pubescence on stem wing margins. Basal leaves are sessile, short-petiolate, spatulate, obovate with bases fused around the stem, glabrous along margins and midvein of the undersurface. Inflorescences are clusters that are small, dense, and usually paired on branch tips that have lanceolate bracts to narrowly elliptic.

Distribution and habitat 
Valerianella radiata distribution is in deciduous forest regions of the eastern United States. This species is commonly found in creek beds, roadsides, ditches, clearings, hilltops, and pasture lands. Valerianella radiata can be found in areas ranging from moderate shade to full sunlight exposure. Valerianella radiata may be present in Japan as an introduced plant.

Conservation status 
It is listed as a special concern and believed extirpated in Connecticut, and listed as endangered in New Jersey. It is listed as a weed in other parts of the United States.

Taxonomy 
Valerianella radiata is an annual, meaning that it grows from a seed, produces seeds, and dies all within a growing season, leaving dormant seeds. Valerianella radiata has funnelform flowers which commonly leads to inbreeding. This species has two varieties: var. radiata and var. fernaldii. Valerianella radiata was originally described by Linnaeus  but was later renamed by Dufresne, Pierre.

Toxicity 
This plant is not known to be toxic.

Edibility 
Young raw leaves and the roots of the plant are edible. Roots of plant are an unlikely food source due to their minuscule size.

Weed control 
Valerianella radiata is a common weed found in some gardens of the southeastern United States due to suitability in many types of soils and pH levels. Applications of 0.11 kg glyphosate/ha was used to controlled V. radiata in non-crop situations.

References

Flora of the United States
radiata